Pragmatics is a quarterly peer-reviewed academic journal covering the field of pragmatics, a subfield of linguistics. It was established in 1991 and is published by John Benjamins Publishing Company on behalf of the International Pragmatics Association (IPrA). The editor-in-chief is Helmut Gruber (University of Vienna).

Abstracting and indexing
The journal is abstracted and indexed in:

According to the Journal Citation Reports, the journal has a 2018 impact factor of 0.848.

References

External links

John Benjamins academic journals
Quarterly journals
Pragmatics journals
Publications established in 1991
English-language journals